Harold Evans was the manager of Blackpool F.C. between 1928 and 1933. After the resignation of Sydney Beaumont, the Blackpool directors, concerned about financial pressure, decided against appointing a full-time replacement and instead appointed Evans, also a director of the club, with the title of honorary manager. He was in charge for the next five seasons, aided by the club's trainers.

In 1929–30, under Evans' guidance, Blackpool won the Division Two championship, their only league title and could look forward to their debut in the top flight. After three seasons amongst the elite, they were relegated back to Division Two, which expedited a move to appoint a recognised manager. Evans, who is Blackpool's fourth longest serving manager, was succeeded by Sandy MacFarlane. He later became the club's chairman.

Honours
Blackpool

Division Two championship: 1929/30

Managerial stats

See also
Blackpool F.C. season 1928-29
Blackpool F.C. season 1929-30
Blackpool F.C. season 1930-31
Blackpool F.C. season 1931-32
Blackpool F.C. season 1932-33

References

External links
Profile at Soccerbase.com

English football managers
Blackpool F.C. managers
English football chairmen and investors
Year of birth missing
Year of death missing